Bruno Mathsson (13 January 190717 August 1988) was a Swedish furniture designer and architect whose ideas aligned with functionalism, modernism, as well as old Swedish crafts tradition.

Biography 

Mathsson was raised in the town of Värnamo in the Småland region of Sweden, the son of a master cabinet maker. After a short time of education in school, he started to work in his father's gallery. He soon found a great interest in furniture and especially chairs, their function and design. In the 1920s and 30s he developed a techniques for building bentwood chairs with hemp webbing. The first model, called the Grasshopper, was used at Värnamo Hospital in 1931.

Edgar Kaufmann Jr., director of the Industrial Design Department at the Museum of Modern Art (MOMA), collected Mathsson's chairs and included them in several exhibitions in the 1940s. Kaufmann considered Mathsson's importance in furniture design on par with that of Alvar Aalto. Kaufmann and his family also had a Mathsson chair at their house Fallingwater.

Mathsson was also an accomplished architect; he completed about 100 structures in the 1940s and 50s. He was the first architect in Sweden to build all-glass structures with heated floors. His furniture showroom in Värnamo (1950) was a significant example; it is well-preserved and open to the public today. For his glass houses, he developed double- and triple-pane insulated glass units called "Bruno-Pane".

He traveled extensively in the United States and was strongly influenced by the solar houses of George Fred Keck. Mathsson's architecture was also influenced by a visit to the Eames House by Charles and Ray Eames in March 1949 just as it was being completed.

Works

Furniture 
 Grasshopper (1931)
 Mimat (1932)
 Pernilla (1934)
 The Eva Chair (1935)
 Folding table (1935)
 Paris Daybed (1937)
 Swivel chair (1939-1940)
 Pernilla Lounge
 Jetson Chair
 Super-Ellipse™ table series, with Piet Hein (1966)
 Annika nesting tables (1968)

Architecture

 Bruno Mathsson furniture showroom, Värnamo (1950)
 house at Danderyd (1955)
 Villa Prenker, Kungsör (1955)
 Kosta Glassworks exhibition hall and residences, Kosta (1956) 
 weekend cottage at Frösakull (1960)
"one of the most daring examples of his glass houses."
 Södrakull, outside Värnamo (1965)

References

External links
 
 

1907 births
1988 deaths
Swedish furniture designers
20th-century Swedish architects
Recipients of the Prince Eugen Medal
People from Värnamo Municipality